Robert Ironside (born 20 August 1967) is a former association football player who represented New Zealand internationally in the late 1980s and early 1990s.

Club career
His club career began with North Shore United before he moved to Australia to join Sydney Olympic in the Australian National Soccer League. After seven seasons with Sydney, Ironside moved for two seasons to Newcastle Breakers He had a year playing for South China and came back to Australia played one season with Sydney Olympic before finishing off in Newcastle

International career
Ironside made his All White debut in a 1-1 draw over Australia national football team on 16 August 1990 and went on to make a total of 56 official A-international appearances in which he scored eleven goals, his final cap earned in a 0-3 loss to Australia on 6 June 1993. Altogether, including unofficial matches, Ironside played 72 matches for the All Whites.

References

External links

 Player Statistics at ozfootball.net

1967 births
Living people
Association football midfielders
New Zealand association footballers
New Zealand international footballers
North Shore United AFC players
Newcastle Breakers FC players
Sydney Olympic FC players
National Soccer League (Australia) players